Union Road is a rural municipality in Prince Edward Island, Canada. It is located in Queens County.

Located in the township of Lot 33, Union Road is one of several communities comprising a green belt surrounding the City of Charlottetown.

Demographics 

References 

Communities in Queens County, Prince Edward Island
Rural municipalities in Prince Edward Island